Genzō, also romanized as Genzo, is a masculine Japanese given name associated with:

, Japanese photographer
, Japanese historical novelist
, Japanese voice actor and disc jockey
, Japanese photographer
, Japanese serial killer

Japanese masculine given names